José Guadalupe Cebreros (born 10 November 1947) is a Mexican boxer. He competed in the men's light middleweight event at the 1968 Summer Olympics where he was defeated in the first round by Soviet fighter Boris Lagutin.

References

External links
 

1947 births
Living people
Mexican male boxers
Olympic boxers of Mexico
Boxers at the 1968 Summer Olympics
Boxers from Sinaloa
Light-middleweight boxers